Colobocentrotus atratus, the helmet urchin or shingle urchin, is a species of sea urchin in the family Echinometridae. In Hawaii it is known as "hāʻukeʻuke." It is found on wave-swept intertidal shores in the Indo-West Pacific, particularly on the shores of Hawaii.

Description
This urchin is a deep maroon colour and shaped like a domed limpet. It can grow to the size of a softball, but is usually much smaller. The upper surface is a mosaic of tiny polygonal plates formed from modified spines to form a smooth mosaic. This is fringed by a ring of large, flattened modified spines. On the underside there is another ring of smaller flattened spines and a large number of tube feet.

Biology
This urchin is usually found on substrates fully exposed to waves and their associated abrasive effect, often in groups. It feeds on periwinkles, other urchins and coralline algae.

In a test comparing shingle urchins to other species of urchin, it was found that their ability to withstand being washed away by moving water excelled. A combination of their shape, their flattened spines and particularly the strong adhesion of their tube feet made them three times as resistant as other species such as Echinometra. This enables them to live on inhospitable wave-battered shorelines.

References

External links

Photographs of a variety of shingle urchines on MarinelifePhotography.com

Echinometridae
Animals described in 1758
Taxa named by Carl Linnaeus